Anakamacops (meaning "similar to Kamacops" in Greek) is a genus of dissorophid temnospondyl from the early Middle Permian of China. It is known from the right side of a snout that was described in 1999 from the Dashankou locality of the Xidagou Formation, which is within the city of Yumen. The type species was named A. petrolicus because Yumen is an oil-producing city (petrol). More substantial material, including a partial skull and partial mandibles, was described by Liu (2018).

Description 
Anakamacops is most similar to Kamacops, sharing features such as a choana widely separated from the interpterygoid vacuities and extensive exostosis ornamenting the skull roof. Both are large taxa; the most complete specimen of Anakamacops measures 26 cm in length despite lacking most of the snout. A number of potentially unique features were suggested based on the additional material described by Liu (2018), such as a relatively edentulous (lacking teeth) vomer and paired (rather than a single, unpaired) occipital ridge.

Phylogenetic analysis from Liu (2018)

References

Dissorophids
Permian temnospondyls of Asia
Permian China
Prehistoric animals of China
Prehistoric amphibian genera